Electromagnetic hypersensitivity (EHS) is a claimed sensitivity to electromagnetic fields, to which negative symptoms are attributed. EHS has no scientific basis and is not a recognised medical diagnosis. Claims are characterized by a "variety of non-specific symptoms, which afflicted individuals attribute to exposure to electromagnetic fields".

Those who are self-described with EHS report adverse reactions to electromagnetic fields at intensities well below the maximum levels permitted by international radiation safety standards.  The majority of provocation trials to date have found that such claimants are unable to distinguish between exposure and non-exposure to electromagnetic fields. A systematic review of medical research in 2011 found no convincing scientific evidence for symptoms being caused by electromagnetic fields. Since then, several double-blind experiments have shown that people who report electromagnetic hypersensitivity are unable to detect the presence of electromagnetic fields and are as likely to report ill health following a sham exposure as they are following exposure to genuine electromagnetic fields, suggesting the cause in these cases to be the nocebo effect.

 the WHO recommended that claims of EHS be evaluated to determine if a person claiming to be affected by EHS has a medical condition that may be causing the symptoms the person is attributing to EHS, to determine if the person has a psychological condition, and to assess the person's environment for issues like air or noise pollution that may be causing problems. Cognitive behavioral therapy may be helpful in managing the condition.

Some people who feel they are sensitive to electromagnetic fields may seek to reduce their exposure or use alternative medicine. Government agencies have enforced false advertising claims against companies selling devices to shield against EM radiation.

Signs and symptoms
There are no specific symptoms associated with claims of EHS, and the reported symptoms range widely between individuals. They include headache, fatigue, stress, sleep disturbances, skin prickling, burning sensations and rashes, pain and ache in muscles and many other health problems. In severe cases such symptoms can be a real and sometimes disabling problem for the affected person, causing psychological distress. There is no scientific basis to link such symptoms to electromagnetic field exposure.

The prevalence of some reported symptoms is geographically or culturally dependent and does not imply "a causal relationship between symptoms and attributed exposure". Many such reported symptoms overlap with other syndromes known as symptom-based conditions, functional somatic syndromes, and IEI (idiopathic environmental intolerance).

Those reporting electromagnetic hypersensitivity will usually describe different levels of susceptibility to electric fields, magnetic fields, and various frequencies of electromagnetic waves. Devices implicated include fluorescent and low-energy lights, mobile, cordless/portable phones, and Wi-Fi. A 2001 survey found that people self-diagnosing as EHS related their symptoms most frequently to cell sites (74%), followed by mobile phones (36%), cordless phones (29%), and power lines (27%). Surveys of people with electromagnetic hypersensitivity have not been able to find any consistent pattern to these symptoms.

Causes
Most blinded conscious provocation studies have failed to show a correlation between exposure and symptoms, leading to the suggestion that psychological mechanisms play a role in causing or exacerbating EHS symptoms. In 2010, Rubin et al. published a follow-up to their 2005 review, bringing the totals to 46 double-blind experiments and 1175 individuals with self-diagnosed hypersensitivity. Both reviews found no robust evidence to support the hypothesis that electromagnetic exposure causes EHS, as have other studies. They also concluded that the studies supported the role of the nocebo effect in triggering acute symptoms in those with EHS.

Diagnosis
Electromagnetic hypersensitivity is not an accepted diagnosis; medically there is no case definition or clinical practice guideline and there is no specific test to identify it, nor is there an agreed-upon definition with which to conduct clinical research.

Complaints of electromagnetic hypersensitivity may mask organic or psychiatric illness: in a recent psychological model of mental disorder, Sébastien Point proposed to consider it as a specific phobia. Diagnosis of those underlying conditions involves investigating and identifying possible known medical causes of any symptoms observed. It may require both a thorough medical evaluation to identify and treat any specific conditions that may be responsible for the symptoms, and a psychological evaluation to identify alternative psychiatric/psychological conditions that may be responsible or contribute to the symptoms.

Symptoms may also be brought on by imagining that exposure is causing harm, an example of the nocebo effect. Studies have shown that reports of symptoms are more closely associated with belief that one is being exposed than with any actual exposure.

Management
Whatever the cause of symptoms attributed to EHS, it can be a debilitating condition that benefits from treatment or management. Cognitive behavioral therapy has shown some success helping people cope with the condition.

As of 2005, WHO recommended that people presenting with claims of EHS be evaluated to determine if they have a medical condition that may be causing the symptoms the person is attributing to EHS, that they have a psychological evaluation, and that the person's environment be evaluated for issues like air or noise pollution that may be causing problems.

A variety of pseudoscientific devices are marketed to those who fear that they are being harmed by electromagnetic fields. The US Federal Trade Commission has warned about scams that involve selling products purported to protect against cell phone radiation. In the UK, a product called 5GBioShield was identified by Trading Standards as a "scam" device. Its manufacturers claimed that it could mitigate harms from phone radiation, however British authorities determined that the device was merely a USB drive.

Prevalence

In 1997, before Wi-Fi, Bluetooth and 3G technology, a group of scientists attempted to estimate the number of people reporting "subjective symptoms" from electromagnetic fields for the European Commission. They estimated that electromagnetic sensitivity occurred in "less than a few cases per million of the population" (based on centres of occupational medicine in UK, Italy and France) or up to "a few tenths of a per cent of the population" (based on self-aid groups in Denmark, Ireland and Sweden). In 2005, the UK Health Protection Agency reviewed this and several other studies for prevalence figures and concluded that "the differences in prevalence were at least partly due to the differences in available information and media attention around electromagnetic hypersensitivity that exist in different countries" and that "Similar views have been expressed by other commentators". The authors noted that most of the studies focused on computer monitors (VDUs), as such the "findings cannot apply in full" to other forms of EMF exposure such as radio waves from mobile phones/base stations.

In 2007, a UK survey aimed at a randomly selected group of 20,000 people found a prevalence of 4% for symptoms self-attributed to electromagnetic exposure.

A 2013 study using telephone surveys in Taiwan, concluded that the rates of IEI-EMF were in decline within the country, despite previous expectations of a rise in prevalence as electronic devices became more widespread. Rates declined from 13% in 2007 to 5% in 2013. The study also referred to apparent declines in the Netherlands (from 7% in 2009 to 4% in 2011) and in Germany (from 10% in 2009 to 7% in 2013). More women believed to be electromagnetically hypersensitive than men.

In 2021, physicist Sébastien Point noted that the prevalence of electrohypersensitivity is similar to the prevalence of specific phobias as well as the gender ratio (2 electrohypersensitive or phobic female for one electrohypersensitive or phobic man), which, according to him, reinforces the hypothesis that electrohypersensitivity is a new specific phobia.

Society and culture
In 2010, a cell tower operator in South Africa revealed at a public meeting that the tower that nearby residents were blaming for their current EHS symptoms had been turned off over six weeks prior to the meeting, thus making it a highly unlikely cause of EHS symptoms.

In February 2014, the UK Advertising Standards Authority found that claims of harm from electromagnetic radiation, made in a product advertisement, were unsubstantiated and misleading.

People have filed lawsuits to try to win damages due to harm claimed from electromagnetic radiation. In 2012, a New Mexico judge dismissed a lawsuit in which one person sued his neighbor, claiming to have been harmed by EM radiation from his neighbor's cordless telephones, dimmer switches, chargers, Wi-Fi and other devices. The plaintiff brought the testimony of his doctor, who also believed she had EHS, and a person who represented himself as a neurotoxicologist; the judge found none of their testimony credible. In 2015, parents of a boy at a school in Southborough, Massachusetts alleged that the school's Wi-Fi was making the boy sick.

In November 2015, a depressed teenage girl in England died by suicide. This act was attributed to EHS by her parents and taken up by tabloids and EHS advocates.

The public position of the EU's Scientific Committee on Emerging and Newly Identified Health Risks (SCENIHR) to the European Commission is that "new improved studies on the association between radio frequency fields from broadcast transmitters and childhood cancer provide evidence against such an association." However, "data on the health effects of intermediate frequency fields used, for example, in metal detectors or anti-theft devices in shops, are still lacking." The SCENIHR called for research to be continued.

Some people who feel they are sensitive to electromagnetic fields self-treat by trying to reduce their exposure to electromagnetic sources by avoiding sources of exposure, disconnecting or removing electrical devices, shielding or screening of self or residence, and alternative medicine. In Sweden, some municipalities provide disability grants to people who claim to have EHS in order to have abatement work done in their homes even though the public health authority does not recognize EHS as an actual medical condition; towns in Halland do not provide such funds and this decision was challenged and upheld in court.

The United States National Radio Quiet Zone is an area where wireless signals are restricted for scientific research purposes, and some people who believe they have EHS have relocated there seeking relief.

Gro Harlem Brundtland, former prime minister of Norway and Director general of the World Health Organization, claims to have EHS. In 2015, she said that she had been sensitive for 25 years.

The 2022 documentary Electric Malady examines the life of a Swedish man called William who claims to have EHS.

See also

 Wireless electronic devices and health
 Electromagnetic radiation and health
 Bioelectromagnetics – the study of the interaction between electromagnetic fields and biological entities
 Microwave auditory effect
 List of questionable diseases
 Radiophobia – the fear of ionizing radiation and radio (RF) waves, originating in the early 1900s
 Arthur Firstenberg – author, "EHS sufferer" and activist
 Tinfoil hat – a popular stereotype and byword for paranoia, persecutory delusions, pseudoscience and conspiracy theories

References

External links 
 Radiofrequency Electromagnetic Energy and Health: Research Needs from the Australian Radiation Protection and Nuclear Safety Agency (ARPANSA) (Technical Report 178 – published June 2017)

Alternative diagnoses
Pseudoscience
Somatic psychology